Marriage in Trouble (German: Ehe in Not) is a 1929 German silent drama film directed by Richard Oswald and starring Elga Brink, Walter Rilla and Evelyn Holt. It was shot at the EFA Studios in Berlin. The film's art direction was by Franz Schroedter. A man considers leaving his wife for another woman, but eventually decides against it. The film was based on a French novel by Georges Antequil.

Cast
 Elga Brink as Frau
 Walter Rilla as Mann
 Evelyn Holt as Mädchen
 Hannele Meierzak as Kind
 Alfred Abel as Lawyer
 Fritz Kampers as Cafétier
 Otto Wallburg
 Willy Rosen
 Trude Berliner
 Elsa Wagner

References

Bibliography
Prawer, S.S. Between Two Worlds: The Jewish Presence in German and Austrian Film, 1910–1933. Berghahn Books, 2005.

External links

1929 films
Films of the Weimar Republic
1929 drama films
German silent feature films
German drama films
Films directed by Richard Oswald
Films produced by Seymour Nebenzal
German black-and-white films
Silent drama films
1920s German films
Films shot at Halensee Studios